Qiniq, from the Inuktitut root word for "to search", is a Canadian company, which uses satellite and wireless communications technology to provide broadband Internet service to remote communities in the Canadian territory of Nunavut. The Qiniq network serves all 25 municipalities in Nunavut with satellite and wireless broadband internet services.

History 
In the fall of 2002, Industry Canada announced the Broadband for Rural and Northern Development (BRAND) program, serving as the catalyst for the creation of Nunavut Broadband Development Corporation (NBDC), a non-profit organization tasked with identifying the territory's broadband needs. NBDC issued a request for proposal to vendors, which SSI Micro won in the spring of 2004. SSI Micro began building of Qiniq, a subsidiary of SSI Micro, which was launched in 2005.

Since its foundation, Qiniq has upgraded its network multiple times, including the implementation of DVB-S2 receivers in 2009, and the installation of LTE technology in 2016.

In January 2014, Qiniq was forced to pay a $128,000 fine after overcharging approximately 600 customers for several months.

In March 2020, the company released a statement asking for users to limit their internet usage due to increased internet usage during the COVID-19 pandemic.

Services 
The company's network incorporates a number of features, such as mesh connectivity, traffic shaping, local web caches, and TCP acceleration.

The Qiniq network is managed centrally by SSI Micro, who maintains the satellite infrastructure, the wireless networks, all back-end hardware as well as the billing and management systems.

The company employs a number of "Community Service Providers", local residents who are tasked with signing up local users, taking payments, and providing technical support to their clients. Qiniq provides technical training to their Community Service Providers, and allows them to keep a percentage of the revenue they bring in.

The Qiniq network received an award in 2005 from the annual awards conferred by the Wireless Communications Association (WCA) for Provisioning Underserved Communities with NLOS Broadband Wireless Technology. The Qiniq network was also a part of the 2005 designation of Nunavut as an "Intelligent Community" by the Intelligent Community Forum, a New York-based think tank.

In September 2018, the company announced a successful rollout of 4G LTE and 2G-GSM technology in all 25 municipalities in Nunvavut.

References

External links
 
 SSI Micro
 Nunavut Broadband

Internet service providers of Canada
Companies based in Nunavut
Communications in Nunavut
Satellite Internet access
Canadian companies established in 2005
2005 establishments in Nunavut
Telecommunications companies established in 2005